Giuseppe Penuti (1810 – 1877) was an Italian painter of the Neoclassic period, active in Milan and known best for his portraits, although he also painted history, vedute, and genre subjects.

Biography
He studied in his native city of Milan at the Brera Academy under Luigi Sabatelli.

Among his works:
Ottone Visconti che mostra l’elmo fregiato d'una biscia (1833), Milan
Portrait of the Engraver Giuseppe Ripamonti, Galleria d'Arte Moderna, Milan 
La Venezia (allegory) exhibited in 1861 in Milan
Un fremito di libertà exhibited in 1867 in Bologna 
Lo steccato dei daini nel giardino pubblico di Milano exhibited in 1869 in Turin
Il ritorno della greggia-effetto di tramonto exhibited in 1876 in Milan

References

1810 births
1877 deaths
19th-century Italian painters
Italian male painters
Brera Academy alumni
Painters from Milan
19th-century Italian male artists